Bikaner House is the former residence of the Maharajah of Bikaner State in New Delhi. It is located close to India Gate.

History 
After the British Raj set up the Chamber of Princes, the rulers needed a residence in the capital city. A number of palaces were constructed in New Delhi, at the coveted Princes’ Park. Around the statue of King George V are the Hyderabad House, Baroda House, Patiala House, Jaipur House, Darbhanga House and Bikaner.

It was designed by Charles G Blomfield. After independence it was bought by the state government of Rajasthan. It was renovated in 2014–15 to be used as a space for arts and culture.

Architecture 
It is spread over an 8-acre plot in Lutyens' Delhi. Among all the princely residences, Bikaner House was the least grand in design, as it was more like a bungalow than a palace.

See also 
 Hyderabad House
 Jaipur House
 Baroda House
 Patiala House

References

Further reading

External links 

 Facebook page of Bikaner House

History of Bikaner
Royal residences in Delhi
Government buildings in Delhi
Government of Rajasthan